On 10 August 2019, a fuel tanker exploded in Morogoro, Tanzania, killing over 100 people and injuring at least 47 others. It was one of the largest disasters of its kind in Tanzania.

A fuel tanker crashed and people gathered at the accident site to collect the fuel. The tanker exploded, initially burning 60 people to death. Video footage of the incident began circulating on social media, in which many people can be seen collecting fuel in yellow containers and jerrycans. Another 55 people were injured in the incident and many suffered serious burns.

Explosion 
The explosion occurred at 8:30 am EAT, 20 minutes after a fuel tanker overturned while trying to avoid colliding with a motorcyclist. The crash happened near Msamvu Bus Terminal. The road on which the crash occurred connects Morogoro to the financial capital Dar es Salaam and is heavily used. Witnesses say that a crowd of at least 150 people gathered at the scene. The crowd began collecting the fuel using yellow jerrycans and continued even when the tanker burst into flames. A video was posted by local news channel Kwanza TV on Twitter, showing groups of people attempting to gather fuel around the tanker.

One of the witnesses, who was identified as Daniel Ngogo, described the scene as chaotic with a huge fire which made it "challenging to rescue victims. The situation is really bad. Many people died here – even those who were not stealing fuel – because this is a busy place".
At 3:00 pm EAT, rescue operations finished and all the bodies were removed from the scene. The regional police commissioner, Wilbard Mutafungwa, stated that many people suffered burns as a result of the explosion.

Official police figures reported 75 deaths and at least 55 people injured. Most of the victims were identified as local motorcycle taxi drivers who were present at the scene and people who attempted to gather fuel. Morogoro regional commissioner Stephen Kebwe said it was the worst disaster in the region, and warned of more possible deaths.

Aftermath
Afterwards, government spokesperson Hassan Abbas said, "the rescue operations finished by 3 p.m. local time. The scene was cordoned off and all bodies were removed from the scene into a local hospital for identification."

President of Tanzania John Magufuli expressed condolences as well as dismay with how the crowd acted.

See also 
2017 Bahawalpur explosion
Ibadan road tanker explosion
Mbuba road tanker explosion
Okobie road tanker explosion

References

2019 fires in Africa
2019 in Tanzania
2019 road incidents
2019 crimes in Tanzania
2010s road incidents in Africa
August 2019 crimes in Africa
August 2019 events in Africa
Deaths caused by petroleum looting
Explosions in 2019
Explosions in Tanzania

Tanker explosion
Road incidents in Tanzania
Tanker explosions
Fires in Tanzania
2019 disasters in Tanzania